The 1958 Colorado State College Bears baseball team represented Colorado State College in the 1958 NCAA University Division baseball season. The Bears played their home games at Jackson Field. The team was coached by Pete Butler in his 16th year at Colorado State.

The Bears lost the District VII playoff, but when BYU opted not to play in the College World Series due to their school's rule to rest on Sundays, the Bears to advanced to the College World Series, where they were defeated by the Southern California Trojans.

Roster

Schedule 

! style="" | Regular Season
|- valign="top" 

|- align="center" bgcolor="#ffcccc"
| 1 || March 18 || at Arizona || UA Field • Tucson, Arizona || 3–17 || 0–1 || –
|- align="center" bgcolor="#ffcccc"
| 2 || March 19 || at Arizona || UA Field • Tucson, Arizona || 1–15 || 0–2 || –
|- align="center" bgcolor="#ccffcc"
| 3 || March 21 || at  || Unknown • Las Cruces, New Mexico || 17–9 || 1–2 || –
|- align="center" bgcolor="#ccffcc"
| 4 || March 22 || at New Mexico A&M || Unknown • Las Cruces, New Mexico || 11–3 || 2–2 || –
|-

|- align="center" bgcolor="#ccffcc"
| 23 || May 21 ||  || Jackson Field • Greeley, Colorado || 9–8 || 17–6 || –
|- align="center" bgcolor="#ccffcc"
| 24 || May 24 || at Air Force || Falcon Baseball Field • Colorado Springs, Colorado || 6–3 || 18–6 || –
|-

|-
|-
! style="" | Postseason
|- valign="top"

|- align="center" bgcolor="#ffcccc"
| 25 || May 30 || at  || Cougar Field • Provo, Utah || 3–4 || 18–7 || –
|- align="center" bgcolor="#ccffcc"
| 26 || May 31 || at BYU || Cougar Field • Provo, Utah || 8–0 || 19–7 || –
|- align="center" bgcolor="#ffcccc"
| 27 || May 31 || at BYU || Cougar Field • Provo, Utah || 5–9 || 19–8 || –
|-

|- align="center" bgcolor="#ccffcc"
| 28 || June 14 || vs Lafayette || Omaha Municipal Stadium • Omaha, Nebraska || 10–5 || 20–8 || –
|- align="center" bgcolor="#ffcccc"
| 29 || June 15 || vs Missouri || Omaha Municipal Stadium • Omaha, Nebraska || 2–11 || 20–9 || –
|- align="center" bgcolor="#ffcccc"
| 30 || June 16 || vs Southern California || Omaha Municipal Stadium • Omaha, Nebraska || 1–12 || 20–10 || –
|-

Awards and honors 
Larry Klumb
 All-Rocky Mountain Conference Team
 Third Team All-American American Baseball Coaches Association

Carl Rohnke
 All-Rocky Mountain Conference Team

References 

Northern Colorado Bears baseball seasons
Colorado State College Bears baseball
College World Series seasons
Colorado State College
Rocky Mountain Athletic Conference baseball champion seasons